Gavarret is a surname of French origin.

People

Louis Denis Jules Gavarret, French scientist
Hunaud de Gavarret, French abbott
Pierre I. de Gavarret, bishop of the Ancient Diocese of Oloron

Places

Gavarret-sur-Aulouste

See also

Gave (placename element)